Stefan Lech Sokołowski Gozdawa coat of arms (25 May 1904 in Warsaw – spring 1940 in Katyń) was a Polish mathematician, climber and porucznik of artillery in Polish Land Forces. Lwów Eaglet (1919). Doctor of mathematical sciences. Victim of Katyn massacre.

Life 
Sokołowski was born 25 May 1904 in Warsaw in the family of Railway engineer and inventor, Witold Sokołowski Gozdawa coat of arms (1871–1944) and writer Anna Maria Sokołowska born Skarbek (1878–1972). In 1912 with mother and sisters, he moved to Myślenice. When he have less than fifteen years old, he fought in defense of Polish Lwów. After war he study mathematics at University of Warsaw. In the interwar period he works in Ballistic Research Center in Rembertów (pol. Centrum Badań Balistycznych w Rembertowie). He earned a PhD in mathematics. In 1933 he graduated from the School Reserve Officer Cadet Artillery in Włodzimierz. First January 1935 was promoted to podporucznik. In 1939, assigned to the staff of OK I.

Spring of 1940, he was murdered by NKVD's functionaries in the Katyn forest.

Awards 
 Silver Crosses of the Virtuti Militari (nr 14384) – collective posthumous honor of Polish soldiers murdered in Katyn and other unknown places of execution granted by the President of Poland in Exile Professor Stanisław Ostrowski (11 November 1976)
 Cross of September Campaign 1939 – collective posthumous medal commemorative of all the victims of the Katyn massacre (1 January 1986)

Family 
He had three sisters: Maria Danuta Żelazowska (died 1933), podpułkownik Grażyna Lipińska (1902–1995) and psychologist and a Home Army soldier, Stefania Żelazowska (1907–1992).

In 1931 he married Cecylia (or Celina) Benisz. They had one daughter – Krystyna (born 1935).

References 

Katyn massacre victims
Military personnel from Warsaw
Recipients of the Silver Cross of the Virtuti Militari
University of Warsaw alumni
20th-century Polish mathematicians
1904 births
1940 deaths
Scientists from Warsaw
Polish military personnel killed in World War II